Orfeas Athienou is a Cypriot football club based in Athienou. Founded in 1948, was playing sometimes in Second, in Third and in Fourth Division.

Honours
 Cypriot Third Division:
 Champions (1): 1985

References

Defunct football clubs in Cyprus
Association football clubs established in 1948
1948 establishments in Cyprus